In mathematics, a compact quantum group is an abstract structure on a unital separable C*-algebra axiomatized from those that exist on the commutative C*-algebra of "continuous complex-valued functions" on a compact quantum group.

The basic motivation for this theory comes from the following analogy. The space of  complex-valued functions on a compact Hausdorff topological space forms a commutative C*-algebra. On the other hand, by the Gelfand Theorem, a commutative C*-algebra is isomorphic to the C*-algebra of continuous complex-valued functions on a compact Hausdorff topological space, and the topological space is uniquely determined by the C*-algebra up to homeomorphism.

S. L. Woronowicz introduced the important concept of compact matrix quantum groups, which he initially called compact pseudogroups. Compact matrix quantum groups are abstract structures on which the "continuous functions" on the structure are given by elements of a C*-algebra. The geometry of a compact matrix quantum group is a special case of a noncommutative geometry.

Formulation
For a compact topological group, there exists a C*-algebra homomorphism

for all , and for all , where

for all  and all .  There also exists a linear multiplicative mapping

,

such that

for all  and all . Strictly speaking, this does not make  into a Hopf algebra, unless  is finite.

Specifically, if

for all , and

for all .

Compact matrix quantum groups
As a generalization, a compact matrix quantum group is defined as a pair , where  is a C*-algebra and

is a matrix with entries in  such that

Since  is antimultiplicative,  for all .

Informally,  can be regarded as the *-algebra of continuous complex-valued functions over the compact matrix quantum group, and  can be regarded as a finite-dimensional representation of the compact matrix quantum group.

Compact quantum groups

A compact quantum group is defined as a pair , where  is a unital separable C*-algebra and

 is a C*-algebra unital homomorphism satisfying ;

Representations
A representation of the compact matrix quantum group is given by a corepresentation of the Hopf *-algebra Furthermore, a representation, v, is called unitary if the matrix for v is unitary, or equivalently, if

Example

First definition

and

Note that  is a representation, but not a unitary representation.  is equivalent to the unitary representation

Second definition

and 

Note that  is a unitary representation. The realizations can be identified by equating .

Limit case
If , then  is equal to the concrete compact group .

References 

Quantum groups
C*-algebras
Hopf algebras